Von Marie Mendez (born September 8, 1950) is a Puerto Rican actress and restaurateur. Alongside such others as Iris Chacon, Millie Aviles, Sully Diaz, Giselle Blondet, Ivonne Goderich, Marilyn Pupo and others, she is remembered as one of the leading actresses during the golden era of telenovelas produced in Puerto Rico, that being between the late 1950s and the early 1990s.

Mendez is a native of the southern city of Ponce.

Acting
Mendez worked as an actress for canal 2, a Telemundo station. Among other well known telenovelas she acted on is 1982's "Fue Sin Querer", 1985's "Tanairi" alongside Juan Ferrara-where she was directed by the famed playwright Dean Zayas-and 1987's "Preciosa", a sequel to "Tanairi" and where she acted alongside Rogelio Guerra.

Restaurateur
In 2007, Mendez opened a restaurant named "Botin" in Ponce. Botin was opened in association with the owners of the "Sobrino de Botín" restaurant in Spain, which is considered the oldest restaurant still operating and was opened in 1725. Several celebrities attended the opening of her restaurant, including former governor Rafael Hernandez Colon and then current governor Anibal Acevedo Vila as well as fellow actor Braulio Castillo, hijo and Mexican singer Fernando Allende.

Personal
Mendez is married to Dr. Vicente Sanchez. She has a son who was born in 1974, chef Luis Freyre, and a daughter who was born in 1980, Von Marie Freyre.

See also
List of Puerto Ricans

External links

Living people
1950 births
Puerto Rican telenovela actresses
Puerto Rican television actresses
Puerto Rican businesspeople
Actresses from Ponce, Puerto Rico
Hispanic and Latino American actresses